José Alcalá Galiano (1843–1919) was a Spanish writer, poet and humorist.

19th-century Spanish writers
19th-century male writers
Spanish male writers
Counts of Spain
1843 births
1919 deaths